Chalhuanca District is one of the seventeen districts of the Aymaraes Province in Peru.

Geography 
Other mountains are listed below:

References

Districts of the Aymaraes Province
Districts of the Apurímac Region